The United States Senate Select Committee on Intelligence (sometimes referred to as the Intelligence Committee or SSCI) is dedicated to overseeing the United States Intelligence Community—the agencies and bureaus of the federal government of the United States that provide information and analysis for leaders of the executive and legislative branches. The Committee was established in 1976 by the 94th Congress.

The Committee is "select" in that membership is temporary and rotated among members of the chamber. The committee comprises 15 members. Eight of those seats are reserved for one majority and one minority member of each of the following committees: Appropriations, Armed Services, Foreign Relations, and Judiciary. Of the remaining seven, four are members of the majority, and three are members of the minority. In addition, the Majority Leader and Minority Leader are non-voting ex officio members of the committee. Also, the Chairman and Ranking Member of the Committee on Armed Services (if not already a member of the select Committee) are ex officio members.

As part of its oversight responsibilities, the Committee performs an annual review of the intelligence budget submitted by the president and prepares legislation authorizing appropriations for the various civilian and military agencies and departments comprising the intelligence community. These entities include the Office of the Director of National Intelligence, Central Intelligence Agency, Defense Intelligence Agency, National Security Agency, National Geospatial-Intelligence Agency, National Reconnaissance Office, as well as the intelligence-related components of Department of State, Federal Bureau of Investigation, Department of the Treasury, and Department of Energy.

The Committee makes recommendations to the Senate Armed Services Committee on authorizations for the intelligence-related components of the U.S. Army, U.S. Navy, U.S. Air Force, and U.S. Marine Corps. The Committee also conducts periodic investigations, audits, and inspections of intelligence activities and programs.

History
The Select Committee on Intelligence was preceded by the Church Committee (1975). Senator Daniel K. Inouye (D-Hawaii) became the first chairman of the committee when it was established until 1979.

On July 8, 2004, the committee issued the Report of the Select Committee on Intelligence on the U.S. Intelligence Community's Prewar Intelligence Assessments on Iraq, and on June 5, 2008, it issued a long-delayed portion of its "phase two" investigative report, which compared the prewar public statements made by top Bush administration officials to justify the invasion with the intelligence information that was available to them at that time.

In a March 6, 2008, letter to the Senate leadership, 14 of the 15 then members of the Committee proposed the creation of a new Senate Appropriations Subcommittee on Intelligence to prepare the annual intelligence budget. The proposed Subcommittee, on which members of the Intelligence Committee would be heavily represented, would increase the Committee's influence and leverage over executive branch intelligence agencies, and require continuing disclosure of the annual budget for the National Intelligence Program.  The proposal has been opposed by the leadership of the Senate Appropriations Committee, however.

In 2013, and beyond, the SSCI received renewed attention in the wake of Edward Snowden's disclosures regarding the NSA surveillance of communications. Senator Dianne Feinstein and the SSCI made several statements on the matter, one of which was notably disputed: that the NSA tracked US citizens locations via cellphone. Later, the SSCI Staff Director, David Grannis, claimed that the NSA did not collect cellphone location, claiming the Senator was "speaking extemporaneously". The SSCI later came to prominence in relation to voting to publish in March 2014 and then publishing in December 2014 of a report on the policies of the CIA on torture.

In 2017, the SSCI began investigating Russian interference in the 2016 United States elections, possible incriminating links between members of the Russian government and members of Donald Trump's presidential campaign team, and the security of election processes in the United States. On April 21, 2020, the SSCI (chaired at the time by the Republican Richard Burr) released a much redacted report with its final judgment that the intelligence community's assessment was "coherent and well-constructed"; the SSCI therefore supports the intelligence community's claim that Putin's "interference in the 2016 U.S. presidential election" in favor of candidate Trump was unprecedented in its "manner and aggressiveness". Nevertheless, no direct evidence of collusion between the Trump campaign and Russia was found.

In 2018, the SSCI Director of Security James Wolfe was arrested and convicted of lying to the FBI on the leak of classified documents to a reporter with whom he was in an affair.

On May 14, 2020, Senator Burr, who oversaw the probe on Russian interference in the 2016 election, stepped down as SSCI chair due to an ongoing investigation regarding insider trading by Senator Burr during the COVID-19 pandemic. Senator McConnell announced on May 18, 2020 that Marco Rubio would replace Burr temporarily.

Members, 118th Congress: January 3, 2023 – January 3, 2025

Historical committee membership

117th Congress: January 3, 2021 - January 3, 2023

116th Congress: January 3, 2019 – January 3, 2021

Source: Member list

115th Congress: January 3, 2017 – January 3, 2019

Source: Member List

Chairs

Staff directors
 Christopher Joyner, 2015–present
 David Grannis, 2009–2014
 Andy Johnson, 2004–2008
 Alfred Cumming, 2000–2003
 George Tenet, 1989–1993

See also
Senate Intelligence Committee report on CIA torture

List of current United States Senate committees
United States House Permanent Select Committee on Intelligence
United States Senate Committee on Armed Services

References

External links
 U.S. Senate Select Committee on Intelligence Official Website
 Committee Publications
 Committee Hearing Schedule & Archive
 Committee Press Releases
 US GPO Congressional Directory includes information on past members
 .

1976 establishments in the United States
Intelligence Select
Organizations established in 1976
United States intelligence agencies
Organizations associated with Russian interference in the 2016 United States elections
Legislative intelligence oversight